Valeriy Andriyovych Dosenko (born 25 April 1965) is a Soviet/Ukrainian rower. He won a gold medal at the 1986 World Rowing Championships in Nottingham with the men's quadruple sculls.  He competed for the Unified Team at the 1992 Summer Olympics and came seventh in the quad scull.

References

1965 births
Living people
Soviet male rowers
World Rowing Championships medalists for the Soviet Union
Olympic rowers of the Unified Team
Rowers at the 1992 Summer Olympics